Iona Lake is a British middle-distance runner, specialising in the 3000 metres steeplechase. She competed at the 2018 Commonwealth Games on the Gold Coast for England. She also runs in the 800 metres, 1500 metres, 3000 metres and 5000 metres distances, but has never competed professionally in these disciplines.

Lake's 3000 m steeplechase personal best of 9:39.03, achieved in Zagreb, Croatia in 2017, places her as the seventh quickest British female steeplechaser of all time in the 3000 m discipline. This performance also allowed her to compete at the 2018 Commonwealth Games, coming six seconds inside the qualifying time.

Race results
All information from the Power of 10 website (rankings and results).

Personal bests

References

1993 births
Living people
British female steeplechase runners
English female steeplechase runners
British Athletics Championships winners
Athletes (track and field) at the 2018 Commonwealth Games
Commonwealth Games competitors for England